Intrigo: Death of an Author is a 2018 German-Swedish-American mystery crime drama film directed by Daniel Alfredson and starring Ben Kingsley and Benno Fürmann.  The film is based on a series of novellas by Håkan Nesser. It is the first of the Intrigo franchise of films.

Plot
David finds the author Alex Henderson living alone on a Greek island. David tells him the story of his novel which interweaves the story of his own life. Nothing is made very clear as the film switches back and forth from the conversation to the plot of the novel and the parallels to David's life.

Cast

Reception
Based on 5 critics on Metacritic, the film has a score of 45 out of a 100, indicating "mixed or average reviews".

Nell Minow of RogerEbert.com awarded the film three stars, explaining her reasoning by writing that "Intrigo: Death of an Author tells us that the gulf between what we want to know and what we can know may never be illuminated". David Robb of Slant Magazine awarded it one and a half stars out of four, criticizing it for being "neither the visceral pleasures of noir nor the precision to uncover deeper thematic resonances".

According to Glenn Kenny of The New York Times, "The stagings are stilted; the relations between the conflicted characters never catch fire".

Michael Rechtshaffen of the Los Angeles Times wasn't impressed by the film either. His reaction was: "[W]hen it comes to intricately strategized stories involving writers and their output, their telling would ultimately have been better served by the reader's imagination".

Sequels
The film has two sequels, Intrigo: Dear Agnes and Intrigo: Samaria, which were released in Germany on October 10, 2019. Phoebe Fox, from the cast of the latter, makes a cameo appearance in this film. All three films have scenes in the café Intrigo.

References

External links

American mystery drama films
American crime drama films
2018 crime drama films
German mystery drama films
German crime drama films
Swedish crime drama films
English-language German films
English-language Swedish films
Films about interpreting and translation
Films about writers
Films based on Swedish novels
Films directed by Daniel Alfredson
Lionsgate films
2010s mystery drama films
Swedish mystery drama films
2010s English-language films
2010s American films
2010s German films
2010s Swedish films
English-language crime drama films